Long Body Creek is an unincorporated community in northern Manitoba, Canada.

References  

Unincorporated communities in Northern Region, Manitoba